Vladimir Alexandrovich Maksheyev (28 May 1843 – 22 March 1901) was a Helsingfors-born Russian stage actor, associated with the Moscow's Maly Theatre.

Life 
A Voronezh Cadet Academy's alumnus, Maksheyev started out as an amateur actor in the Moscow-based Shepelev troupe as well as the Artistic Circle. Upon the retirement from the military service, he joined the Medvedev Troupe in Kazan (1870–1871), then worked in Saratov, Kursk, Tula and later several Moscow collectives, before joining the Maly in 1874 to stay there for the rest of his life. His best-known parts were Rispolozhensky (It's a Family Affair-We'll Settle It Ourselves by Alexander Ostrovsky, 1874), Rasplyuyev (Krechinsky's Wedding by Aleksandr Sukhovo-Kobylin, 1874), Arkhip (The Major's Wife, by Ippolit Shpazhinsky, 1878), Varlaam (Boris Godunov, by Alexander Pushkin, 1880), Migayev (Talents and Admirers, by Ostrovsky, 1881), The Mayor (Revizor by Nikolai Gogol, 1883), Vosmibratov (The Forest by Ostrovsky, 1895).

References 

19th-century male actors from the Russian Empire
Russian male stage actors
Male actors from Helsinki
People from Uusimaa Province (Grand Duchy of Finland)
1843 births
1901 deaths